Simone Thion de la Chaume (24 November 1908 – 4 September 2001) was a French amateur golfer.

In 1924, she became the first foreign player to win the Girls Amateur Championship and in 1927 the first to win the British Ladies Amateur, then the most prestigious tournament in British and European ladies' golf and an event her daughter, Catherine Lacoste, would also win 42 years later.

At the 1927 U.S. Women's Amateur, she lost in the third round to former three-time champion, Alexa Stirling.

While attending a Davis Cup match, Simone de la Chaume met the French tennis star René Lacoste. They married in 1929 and had three sons and a daughter. The Lacostes would go on to form the Lacoste company and build a sportswear empire. They also founded the Golf de Chantaco club in Saint-Jean-de-Luz in the Pyrénées-Atlantiques département of France near Biarritz.

Simone Lacoste died in Saint-Jean-de-Luz in 2001.

Principal victories
 1924: Girls Amateur Championship
 1927: British Ladies Amateur
 1930, 1935, 1938, 1939: French International Ladies Golf Championship
 1936, 1937, 1939: French Ladies National Championship

References

French female golfers
Amateur golfers
Winners of ladies' major amateur golf championships
1908 births
2001 deaths
20th-century French women